Peter Bramall (born 10 November 1950 in Lincolnshire, England), better known by his stage name Bram Tchaikovsky, is a British vocalist and guitarist.

He first came to prominence as a member of UK punk/pub rock band The Motors, whom he joined in 1977. After he left them, he led an eponymous power pop band, with Micky Broadbent (bass, keyboards) and Keith Boyce (drums).  He scored a US Top 40 hit single on the Billboard Hot 100 in 1979, with "Girl of My Dreams" (released February in UK, June in USA).  In the Netherlands, "Sarah Smiles" was a minor hit, reaching number 32 in April 1979. Nick Garvey, Keith Line and Denis Forbes were also involved in later band lineups. In 1979 he played guitar for the Skids hit 'Into The Valley' on the BBC. After disappointing sales, the band split up in 1981 and Tchaikovsky left the music industry.

Tchaikovsky was also credited with co writing "Solid Ball of Rock", from the 1991 Saxon album of the same name.

Re-releases
In 1998, as part of a "British Rock" reissue series, WEA Japan rereleased both Strange Man, Changed Man and The Russians Are Coming albums on CD, using original master tapes and artwork. In addition to the original artwork and liner notes, each CD contained extensive historical information, song lyrics and musical commentary (albeit in Japanese).  These CDs were only available in Japan and are now out of production.

Strange Man, Changed Man had been expanded to 21 tracks and included rare B-sides and live cuts.  It is only available on the web. Strange Man, Changed Man included newly remastered tracks, featuring the hit single "Girl of My Dreams", the track "Lonely Dancer" (which were both written by Heavy Metal Kid Ronnie Thomas), and ten bonus tracks. The bonus tracks included hard-to-find singles, B-sides, and live tracks. Be wary of this release as all tracks are taken from vinyl LPs and some tracks have considerable needle noise - very low-fi sound quality. 

In December 2007, Strange Man, Changed Man was issued in the US on the Hip-O Select label (ASIN: B000ZIZ0ZC) in digital sound and with full artwork. This CD release used the original master tapes sequenced for the original US release; the track running order is therefore different from the original UK album, and different from the 1998 Japanese CD version.

In February 2012, a live recording, Live at the Lochem Festival, 1979, appeared on Tiger Eye with the songs "Sarah Smiles", "Robber", "Nobody Knows", "Turn on the Lights" and "Girl of My Dreams".

In April 2018,  Cherry Red Records released Bram Tchaikovsky: Strange Men, Changed Men: The Complete Recordings 1978 – 1981, a 3CD Boxset fully endorsed by Bram Tchaikovsky.

Album discography

Singles

References

External links
The Mod Pop Punk Archives: Bram Tchaikovsky
Strange Man Changed Man - Heavy Metal Kids website

1950 births
Living people
English rock guitarists
English male singers
Radar Records artists
Polydor Records artists
Arista Records artists
The Motors members
English male guitarists